Events in the year 1515 in Portugal.

Incumbents
King of Portugal and the Algarves: Manuel I

Events
2 February - Creation of the Count of Vimioso title of nobility.
Creation of the Duke of Goa title.
Afonso de Albuquerque ended his term as Governor of Portuguese India.
Lopo Soares de Albergaria becomes Governor of Portuguese India.
The Fort Santo Antonio was built.

Births
7 October - Edward of Portugal, 4th Duke of Guimarães, infante (died 1540)
Cristóvão da Costa, doctor and natural historian (died 1594)
Febo Moniz, nobleman

Deaths
10 April - Mateus Fernandes, architect
16 December - Afonso de Albuquerque (born 1453)

See also
History of Portugal (1415–1578)

References

 
Years of the 16th century in Portugal
Portugal